Christina Moore (born April 12, 1973) is an American actress, comedian, fashion designer, model and screenwriter. She was in the main cast of the sketch comedy series MADtv, played Laurie Forman on That '70s Show during its sixth season, and played Candy Sullivan on Hawthorne. She had a recurring role in 90210 and on Disney’s hit series Jessie.

Early life
Moore was born in Palatine, Illinois. She became interested in performing as a young girl at her family's church by getting involved with children. When she was in high school, she toured with a children's musical theatre troupe throughout the city of Chicago.

Her first professional job was in summer stock in Lincoln City, Indiana, where she performed in Young Abe: the Abraham Lincoln Boyhood Outdoor Musical Drama. Her theatre roles included productions of Annie, Cinderella and Big River. Her father is Carroll Moore and her mother is Joy Moore. She has one younger sister.

Career
After graduating from Illinois Wesleyan University School of Theatre Arts, Moore moved to Los Angeles to pursue her acting career. Her television credits include the UPN comedy The Bad Girl's Guide and the drama Hyperion Bay, recurring roles on Pasadena and Unhappily Ever After, and guest appearances on 24, Just Shoot Me!, Friends, and Suddenly Susan.

MADtv
Moore joined the cast of MADtv in 2002 as a featured performer for the eighth season, where she was noted for her impressions of Christina Aguilera, Shannon Elizabeth, Sharon Stone, Trista Rehn and Brittany Murphy. With Josh Meyers, she is one of two former MadTV members to join the cast of That '70s Show.

Other entertainment projects
Moore appeared in Married...with Children as the Gorgeous Woman in the episode "Twisted" (1996). She left the MADtv at the conclusion of the eighth season to join the cast of That '70s Show. She replaced Lisa Robin Kelly as Laurie Forman during the show's sixth season. In 2005, she starred in the TV series Hot Properties, which had aired 13 episodes. She also starred in Without a Paddle and Dave Barry's Complete Guide to Guys. She also appeared in Two and a Half Men as Cynthia Sullivan in the episode "The Soil is Moist" (2008). She played Alan Harper's rebound lover on Two and a Half Men. In 2008, she began a recurring role on The CW's 90210 as Tracy Clark, the sexy and mischievous mother of Naomi Clark. She also narrates various audio books, including Diane Duane's Young Wizards series and Yellow Star. She was part of the main cast of Hawthorne playing Candy Sullivan.

Moore is a founding member of Bitches Funny, an all-female sketch group that has performed in New York City and Los Angeles for the past five years. She also had a recurring role in the Disney Channel shows Jessie and Bunk'd as Christina, the mother of the Ross children, in Sonny with a Chance as Tammi, Tawni's mother, as well as Vanessa Baxter's empty-headed sister April on the former ABC sitcom Last Man Standing.

Personal life
Moore has been married to actor John Ducey since 2008.

Filmography

Screenwriting
 Pray for Rain (2017)
 Running Wild (2017)

References

External links
 
 

1973 births
20th-century American actresses
21st-century American actresses
Actresses from Illinois
American film actresses
American impressionists (entertainers)
American television actresses
American women comedians
Living people
People from Palatine, Illinois
American sketch comedians
American women screenwriters
Comedians from Illinois
Screenwriters from Illinois
20th-century American comedians
21st-century American comedians